Nihonia is a genus of sea snails, marine gastropod mollusks in the family Cochlespiridae.

Species
Species within the genus Nihonia include:
 Nihonia australis (Roissy, 1805)
 Nihonia circumstricta (Martens, 1901)
 Nihonia maxima Sysoev, 1997
 Nihonia mirabilis (Sowerby III, 1914)

Extinct species
 † Nihonia birmanica (Vredenburg, 1921)
 † Nihonia pervirgo (Yokoyaina, 1928)
 † Nihonia shimajiriensis MacNeil, 1960. Type species from the Miocene of Okinawa.
 † Nihonia santosi Sbuto, 1969
 † Nihonia soyomaruae (Otuka, 1959)
 † Nihonia sucabumiana (K. Martin, 1895)

References

 MacNeil F. S. (1961 ["1960"]) Tertiary and Quaternary Gastropoda of Okinawa. United States Geological Survey Professional Paper 339: iv + 148 pp., 21 pls

External links